Vadim Gennadievich Tarasov (born December 31, 1976) is a retired Kazakhstani-Russian professional ice hockey goaltender.

Tarasov was drafted 196th overall by the Montreal Canadiens in the 1999 NHL Entry Draft and after two seasons with Metallurg Novokuznetsk he signed a contract in 2001 and was assigned to their AHL affiliate the Quebec Citadelles, but played in only 14 regular season games and returned to Russia the next season, re-joining Metallurg Novokuznetsk.  He remained with the team until 2006 where he signed for Salavat Yulaev Ufa.

His son, Daniil, is a professional ice hockey goaltender who was drafted 86th overall by the Columbus Blue Jackets in the third round of the 2017 NHL Entry Draft.

External links
 Vadim Tarasov's career stats at KHL Database

1976 births
Expatriate ice hockey players in Russia
Metallurg Novokuznetsk players
HC Neftekhimik Nizhnekamsk players
Kazakhstani ice hockey players
Kazzinc-Torpedo players
Living people
Montreal Canadiens draft picks
Sportspeople from Oskemen
Quebec Citadelles players
Salavat Yulaev Ufa players
Russian ice hockey goaltenders
Kazakhstani people of Russian descent